Bate is a surname, derived from a diminutive of Bartholomew. Notable people with the surname include:

Ahmade Bate (1417–1491), Kurdish poet and cleric
Anthony Bate (1927–2012), English actor
C. T. Bate (1823–1889), Canadian politician
Charles Spence Bate (1819–1889), British zoologist and dentist
Dorothea Bate (1878–1951), British paleontologist
Ed Bate (1901–1999), New Zealand politician
Henry Bate of Malines (1246–14th-century), Flemish philosopher, theologian, astronomer, astrologer, poet and musician
Jeff Bate (1906–1984), Australian politician
Jennifer Bate (1944–2020), English organist
Jonathan Bate (born 1958), British scholar
Matthew Bate (born 1987), Australian rules footballer
Michael Bate, Canadian media entrepreneur
Mike Bate (born 1943), English professor of biology
Roger Bate, economist
Roger R. Bate (1923–2009), U.S. Army and Air Force officer, Computer and Astrodynamic Scientist
Stanley Bate (1911–1959), English composer and pianist
Tyler Bate (born 1997), English professional wrestler
Walter Jackson Bate (1918–1999), American literary critic
William B. Bate (1826–1905), governor of Tennessee
William Thornton Bate (1820–1857), Royal Navy officer and surveyor
Zara Bate (1909–1989), Australian fashion designer

English-language surnames
Patronymic surnames